Relational may refer to:

Business
 Relational capital, the value inherent in a company's relationships with its customers, vendors, and other important constituencies
 Relational contract, a contract whose effect is based upon a relationship of trust between the parties
 Relational goods, goods that cannot be enjoyed alone
 Relational Investors, an activist investment fund based in San Diego, California

Computing
 Relational calculus, part of the relational model for databases that provides a declarative way to specify database queries
 Relational database, a database that has a collection of tables of data items, all of which is formally described and organized according to the relational model
 Relational classification, the procedure of performing classification in relational databases
 Relational data mining, the data mining technique for relational databases
 Relational concept, a set of mathematically defined tuples in tuple relational calculus
 Relational model, a database model based on first-order predicate logic
 Relational operator, a programming language construct or operator that tests or defines some kind of relation between two entities

Linguistics
 Relational grammar, a syntactic theory which argues that primitive grammatical relations provide the ideal means to state syntactic rules in universal terms
 Relational noun, a class of words used in many languages
 Relational oppositeness, the relationship between two words which seem to be opposites but actually imply each other

Mathematics
 Relational algebra, an offshoot of first-order logic and of algebra of sets concerned with operations over finitary relations
 Relation (mathematics) such as binary relation, a collection of ordered pairs of elements of a set

Psychology
 Relational aggression or covert bullying, a type of aggression in which harm is caused through damage to one's relationships or social status
 Relational disorder, a disorder affecting a relationship rather than an individual in the relationship
 Relational psychoanalysis, a school of psychoanalysis in the United States that emphasizes the role of real and imagined relationships with others in mental disorder and psychotherapy

Other uses
 Relational art, a mode or tendency in fine art practice originally observed and highlighted by French art critic Nicolas Bourriaud
 Relational dialectics, a concept within communication theory
 Relational theory, a framework to understand reality or a physical system in such a way that the positions and other properties of objects are only meaningful relative to other objects

See also
 Relational schema (disambiguation)